Rise is the first EP by RSO, which consists of Orianthi and Richie Sambora. The EP was released on September 29, 2017.

Track listing

References

2017 EPs
Rock EPs
Orianthi albums
Richie Sambora albums